Salomon Group is a French sports equipment manufacturing company based in Annecy, France. It was founded in 1947 by François Salomon in the heart of the French Alps and is a major brand in outdoor sports equipment. Salomon constitutes a part of Amer Sports, owned since 2019 by the Chinese group ANTA Sports with sister brands Wilson, Atomic, Sports Tracker, Suunto, Precor, Arc'teryx.

History
Salomon was founded in 1947 in the city of Annecy in the heart of the French Alps. Francois Salomon launched the company by producing ski edges in a small workshop, with only his wife and son, Georges, to help. Georges Salomon is credited with taking the company and evolving it toward the global outdoor sports brand it is today.

Operations
Today, Salomon produces products for various sports markets, including trail running, hiking, climbing, adventure racing, skiing, and snowboarding in over 40 countries on five continents. They used to manufacture inline skates, transferring technologies from their ski boot range, but have not released any in recent years.

Salomon's current CEO is Franco Fogliato. Salomon is part of Amer Sports, headquartered in Helsinki (Finland).
The US operations of Salomon are located in Ogden, Utah.

Salomon also sponsors and hosts many trail races throughout the world, including the Golden Trail Series. It also runs Salomon TV, a channel that tells inspirational stories about athletes, places and interesting characters from the world of skiing, trail running, and the outdoors.

References

External links

Story Behind Salomon Skis
Skiing History - Georges P.J. Salomon
Justia - Salomon patents
Best Salomon Boots - Bootwisdom

Sportswear brands
Sporting goods manufacturers of France
Outdoor clothing brands
Clothing companies of France
French brands
Sporting goods brands
Ski equipment manufacturers
Shoe companies of France
Sport in Annecy
Manufacturing companies established in 1947
French companies established in 1947
1997 mergers and acquisitions
2005 mergers and acquisitions
French subsidiaries of foreign companies